NGC 1427 is a low-luminosity elliptical galaxy approximately 71 million light-years away from Earth. It was discovered by John Frederick William Herschel on November 28, 1837. It is located in the Fornax Cluster.

Characteristics
NGC 1427 is an E5 galaxy. It has a diameter of 70 000 light-years. There are 510 globular clusters around the galaxy.

NGC 1427 underwent a merger event within the last 8 billion years.

The now-consumed satellite galaxy contributed  to the mass of NGC 1380, which is about one-fourth of its current mass.

References

External links
 
 

Elliptical galaxies
Fornax Cluster
Fornax (constellation)
1427
13609